Pothyne multilineata is a species of beetle in the family Cerambycidae. It was described by Pic in 1934.

References

multilineata
Beetles described in 1934